Pavel Dmitriyevich Lychnikov is a Russian-American television, voice, film and theatre actor, who lives and works in the United States.

Early life and education
Lychnikoff was born in Moscow, where he later received formal training at the Russian Academy of Theatre Arts (also known as GITIS from 1934 to 1991).

Career
In the early 1990s, Lychnikoff moved to the United States. Since his subsequent move to Los Angeles, he has appeared in many TV movies and series and feature films. He is noted for his roles as the telegraph operator Blazanov in HBO's Deadwood series, as Russian mobster Vadim Youchenko in the movie Trade and as Dima in Battlefield 4. He also appears as Howard Wolowitz's Russian cosmonaut crewmate Dimitri in the TV series The Big Bang Theory.

Lychnikoff has also made several stage appearances in Russia and the U.S. His self-written play The Shelter, which he also directed, was nominated for the Californian Ovation Award in five categories, and Lychnikoff's performance in it received positive reviews from a number of critics.

Filmography

Film

Television

Video and computer games

References

External links

Male actors from Moscow
Living people
Russian Academy of Theatre Arts alumni
Soviet emigrants to the United States
Russian emigrants to the United States
American male film actors
American male television actors
American male voice actors
American male video game actors
20th-century American male actors
21st-century American male actors
Year of birth missing (living people)